This is a list of NASA aircraft. Throughout its history NASA has used several different types of aircraft on a permanent, semi-permanent, or short-term basis. These aircraft are usually surplus, but in a few cases are newly built, military aircraft.

Current aircraft

Aircraft

References

Bibliography

External links 

 Where Are They Now? at NASA Dryden

Aircraft
United States special-purpose aircraft